Johan Fredrik "John" Olin (30 June 1883 – 3 December 1928) was a Finnish wrestler who competed in the 1912 Summer Olympics. He won the silver medal in the heavyweight class.

In 1916, Olin captured a claim to the World Heavyweight championship after a controversial bout with Joe Stecher in Springfield, Massachusetts. On 12 December 1916, in one of the great forgotten matches and upsets in wrestling history, he defeated Stecher. After 2 hrs and 40 min., both wrestlers ended up outside the ring brawling. Olin wanted to continue but Stecher declined to return to the ring. Olin was awarded the bout by the referee. Stecher injured his shoulder during the match and was out of the ring for over 1 months. In newspaper reports no mention of the title is made. Why the public continued to support Stecher is unclear. John Olin's promoters claimed the World Title but Olin was mild mannered and didn't make much noise about being the champion. It may be that the press refused to accept Olin as champion because his win was fluke due to injury and no one believe Olin could truly defeat Stecher. Also Frank Gotch was still alive at the time and many still saw him as the "real" world champion. As Stecher didn't consider himself defeated, the idea of Olin as champ had much going against it. This claim to the title, called the Olin Line by historians, did continue. Olin lost his claim "world title" to Ed "Strangler" Lewis in Chicago on 2 May 1917. After 2 hours and 37 minutes, John Olin concedes match due to a shoulder injury. Referee was Frank Gotch and he praised Lewis as the best. The Strangler would not be as mild manner as Olin, and actively claimed the title. Olin resided in Worcester, Massachusetts during his stay in the United States, and wrestled as a professional for several years. He died in Ingå, Finland.

References

External links
 
 The World Title and Contenders of 1915 to 1920 by Steve Yohe
 
 
 

1883 births
1928 deaths
Wrestlers at the 1912 Summer Olympics
Finnish male sport wrestlers
Olympic wrestlers of Finland
Olympic silver medalists for Finland
Olympic medalists in wrestling
Medalists at the 1912 Summer Olympics
Finnish male professional wrestlers
19th-century Finnish people
20th-century Finnish people